"Payday" is the 22nd episode of Season 3 of the CBS-TV series M*A*S*H.

Overview
Things get crazy at the 4077th when payday comes around, and everybody is spending money and getting into debt with everyone else. "Hot Lips" tricks Frank Burns into giving her a real pearl necklace in place of a fake, Klinger tries to bribe Lieutenant Colonel Blake for a discharge (but withdraws the offer when he learns he could get twenty years in prison), and Trapper John "borrows" Hawkeye's watch to bet in a poker game.

Paymaster Hawkeye receives $3,000 compensation for lost civilian pay, which he donates to Father Mulcahy, but bureaucrat Captain Sloan arrives from headquarters, demanding the money back. After Trapper wins the poker game, Hawkeye promptly takes back his watch and Trapper's winnings, paying off his debt to the Army, with an $8 surplus for Hawkeye (charging four dollars an hour for the rent of his watch).

External links
 

M*A*S*H (season 3) episodes
1975 American television episodes